Caribarctia is a genus of moths in the subfamily Arctiinae first described by Douglas Campbell Ferguson in 1985. Both species are found in the Dominican Republic.

Species
Caribarctia cardinalis Ferguson, 1985
Caribarctia bertrandae Vincent, 2006

References

Arctiinae
Moths of the Caribbean